Chandra or Chandar was a Brahmin ascetic who succeeded his brother, Chach of Alor, as king of Sindh region of the Indian subcontinent. An account of Chandar's reign is presented in the Chach Nama, a recording of this period of Sindhi history and the broader history of the Indian subcontinent.

Life and activity prior to reign
According to the Chach Nama, the Brahmin Chach of Alor was chamberlain and secretary to Rai Sahasi II, king of Sindh region of the Indian subcontinent. Chach ascended to the throne by marrying the king's widow, and appointed Chandar as his deputy. Chandar assisted in the administration of the kingdom during Chach's successful campaigns of expansion, and succeeded Chach upon his death.

Conflict with Kannuaj
After Chach's death, Matta, the ruler of Sehwan Sharif, began to conspire against Chandar. Matta had formerly been the autonomous chief of Siwistan; however, he had been subjugated during one of Chach's campaigns, and intended to regain independence. He sent an emissary to Siharas, ruler of Kannauj, noting that Chandar was a monk who allegedly spent his entire day at prayer, and who would thus be a weak foe. He asked Siharas to invade Sindh, and to cede a portion of these lands to Siwistan. Siharas refused, but conceded to Matta's request for a governorship if he succeeded in conquering Sindh. Matta agreed to pay tribute to Siharas in exchange for this post.

Aligned with Chach's grandson, Siharas entered Sindh and besieged Chandar in Alor. During a parley with Sindhi forces, Siharas was seized; he agreed to end the war, sending hostages with robes of honor to Chandar. Chandar eventually formed an alliance with Siharas. Chandar’s reign lasted for eight years, according to the Chach Nama; his nephew Raja Dahir, Chach's eldest son, succeeded him after his death.

References

Chach Nama
History of Sindh
Hindu monarchs
History of Rajasthan
7th-century monarchs in Asia
Indian Buddhists